Cryptopora is a genus of brachiopods belonging to the family Cryptoporidae.

The species of this genus are found in all oceans.

Species:

Cryptopora boettgeri 
Cryptopora curiosa 
Cryptopora gnomon 
Cryptopora hesperis 
Cryptopora maldiviensis 
Cryptopora norfolkensis 
Cryptopora rectimarginata

References

Brachiopod genera